Several ancient Egyptian solar ships and boat pits were found in many ancient Egyptian sites. The most famous is the Khufu ship now preserved in the Grand Egyptian Museum. The full-sized ships or boats were buried near ancient Egyptian pyramids or temples at many sites. The history and function of the ships are not precisely known. They might be of the type known as a "solar barge", a ritual vessel to carry the resurrected king with the sun god Ra across the heavens. However, some ships bear signs of being used in water, and it is possible that these ships were funerary barges.

Comparative table of solar ships

Giza Necropolis

Khufu 

Seven boat pits have been identified around the Great Pyramid, five of which belong to the Great Pyramid proper. The other two are associated with the pyramid of Hetepheres (GIa) and the pyramid of the Ka (GId). Khufu's boat pits are located on the eastern side of the pyramid and the southern side.

Khufu First Solar ship
The Khufu ship is an intact full-size vessel from ancient Egypt that was sealed into a pit in the Giza pyramid complex at the foot of the Great Pyramid of Giza around 2500 BC. It was thus identified as the world's oldest intact ship and has been described as "a masterpiece of woodcraft" that could sail today if put into water. The Khufu ship is one of the oldest, largest, and best-preserved vessels from antiquity. It measures 43.6 m (143 ft) long and 5.9 m (19.5 ft) wide.

The ship was one of two rediscovered in 1954 by Kamal el-Mallakh – undisturbed since it was sealed into a pit carved out of the Giza bedrock. It took years for the boat to be painstakingly reassembled, primarily by the Egyptian Department of Antiquities’ chief restorer, Ahmed Youssef Moustafa (later known as Haj Ahmed Youssef).

The ship was housed in the Giza Solar boat museum before being moved to the Grand Egyptian Museum.

In one of the southern boat pits a disassembled wooden barge was discovered in 1954. It has been reconstructed and resides in the boat shaped museum.  In 1987, the western boat pit at the Great Pyramid was examined by a microprobe inserted through a hole drilled into the pit, confirming the presence of a second wooden boat similar to the first. It was originally decided that the second boat should remain in its pit, in conditions which made its preservation near perfect.

Khufu Second Solar ship
The excavation of the second solar boat of Khufu was finished in 2021. The ship will be reconstructed and displayed in the Grand Egyptian Museum. Sakuji Yoshimura, a Waseda University professor who is leading the restoration project with Egypt's Antiquities Council, said that scientists discovered that one of the cover stones of the boat pit is inscribed with Khufu's name.

Hetepheres Solar ship
Associated with the pyramid of Hetepheres I (GIa).

Ka Solar Ship
Associated with the pyramid of the Ka (GId).

Khafre Solar ship

Khafre's pyramid has five pits that once contained funeral boats.  One known boat pit is alongside the east face of Khafre's pyramid. Another two of the covered boat pits of Khafre lie on the east side of the pyramid and a further covered boat pit lies on the south side of the mortuary temple of Khafre.

Abu Gorab

Niuserre Solar ship
A few hundred meters to the north of Abusir, about six miles southwest of Cairo is the sun temple known as Abu Gorab. There lies the ruins of Niuserre's temple, Outside the temple proper and near its southern side, the German expedition also discovered a large building in the shape of a boat. This was a pit, lined with mud bricks which was at one time plastered, whitewashed and colored. This structure was augmented with several other elements made from different materials such as wood. This structure is believed to have been purely symbolic, representing a "solar boat" in which the sun god was supposed to have floated across the heavenly ocean. (The pit might have contained a boat)

Abu Rawash

King Den Solar ship
A wooden funerary boat thought to have once belonged to First Dynasty King Den has been discovered at Abu Roash, the place of the pyramid of Khufu's son, Djedefre. Unearthed in the northern area of Mastaba number six (a flat-roofed burial structure) at the archaeological site, boat consists of eleven large wooden planks reaching six metres high and 1.5 metres wide. Two boats were discovered at Abu Rawash hill M. (2 boats or Ships)

Djedefre Solar ship
At the complex of Djedefre, Emile Chassinat, between 1900 and 1902, discovered the remains of a funerary settlement and a boat pit. The solar boat pit is situated on the east side of the pyramid. It is a ditch 35 meters long cut out of the living limestone. It is destined for the royal boat. The beautiful heads carved into the likeness of Djedefre were found there.

Abusir

Neferirkare Solar ship
Neferirkare's pyramid at Abusir was the largest structure in the region. Large wooden boats were buried outside the pyramid in its courtyard on the north and south sides. Archaeologists discovered them by their mention in a cache of papyrus found within the mortuary temple, but unfortunately, when they excavated the southern boat pit, only dust remained of the boat itself.

Abydos

The Abydos ships have the honor of being the world's oldest planked boats.

Hor-Aha Solar ships
In 1991, in the desert near the temple of Khentyamentiu near Abydos, archaeologists uncovered the remains of the fourteen ships dating back to the early first dynasty (2950–2775 BC), possibly associated with Hor-Aha. These  ships are buried side by side and have wooden hulls, rough stone boulders which were used as anchors, and "sewn" wooden planks. Also found within their desert graves were remains of the woven straps that joined the planks, as well as reed bundles that were used to seal seams between planks.

Abydos had at least a dozen boat graves  adjacent to a massive funerary enclosure for the late Dynasty II (ca. 2675 B.C.) Pharaoh Khasekhemwy. Their age should be more than 400 years older than Khufu's (Cheops)
Ships were  25 meters long, 2.5 meters wide and about 0.5 meters deep, seating about 30 rowers. They had narrowing sterns and prows and they were painted.
They are in meaning and function the direct ancestors of the boat recovered at Khufu's Great Pyramid at Giza
The ships are possibly associated with King Aha, the first ruler of that dynasty. The length of the structures varied from nearly 20 to 27m.

These are the world's most ancient planked hulls. The traditions of the hull construction seen in all the excavated vessels continued through the end of the sixth century BC and, with the substitution of nails for mortise-and-tenon joints, into the present. An abandoned freighter, stripped of its internal timbers and left on a small branch of the Nile near Mataria (ancient Heliopolis, north of modern Cairo) provides the first instance of pegged mortise-and-tenon joints in an Egyptian hull. Not all joints were through-fastened, and the pegs, or treenails, may also have fastened frames to the hull, but for this marks a dramatic departure from previous shipbuilding techniques.

Dahshur

Senusret III Solar ships
Six boats, known as the Dahshur boats dating from the Middle Kingdom were found at Dahshur. They are about 10 m long each. In 1893, French archaeologist Jacques de Morgan discovered six boats near the Middle Kingdom pyramid of Senusret III at Dashur. He made drawings and measurements of only one boat (the White boat) from the cache at Dahshur. One of the ships measure 18 meters.

Excavations conducted in 1894 and 1895 by de Morgan at the funerary complex of Senusret III on the plain of Dahshur revealed five or six small boats. Today, only four of the "Dahshur boats" can be located with certainty; two are in the United States, one in the Carnegie Museum of Natural History in Pittsburgh and one in the Field Museum of Natural History in Chicago. The remaining two were on display in the Cairo Museum, but were relocated to the Sharm El-Sheikh Museum in 2020.

Since their excavation these boats remained relatively inconspicuous until the mid-1980s when a study of the two hulls in the United States was conducted.

Amenemhat III Solar ship
The Ship pit was discovered at the south perimeter of his pyramid, it measured 15 meter by 5.57 meters.

Saqqara

Mastabas
A 'model estate' and funerary boat was found at Saqqara by W. Emery (in 1957–58; tomb S 3357, 3 ships).  At least 3 mud-brick boat graves were associated with First Dynasty rulers and high-ranking officials.

Unas Solar ship
The Pyramid of Unas in North Saqqara has two boats. One the boat pits is 44 meter long and is located 150 meter away from the remains of the funeral temple. Lined with limestone blocks these boat pits are thought to have been simulacra of solar boats.

Tarkhan
Remains of Old Kingdom boats were found at Tarkhan (at least one boat)

Helwan
Archaic boats had been found at Helwan by Z. Saad. (4 Ships) In total 4 or 5 boat burials were found at Helwan, 2 at Abu Roash Hill M, and finally others at the northerly Abydos site of the Royal enclosures, near those just found.

Lisht

Senusret Solar ship
Forty timbers were found in excavations near the Pyramid of Senusret I in Lisht. They were identified as part of vessel or vessels.

Amenemhat I Solar ship
A mudbrick boat pit has also been found outside Amenemhat I’s pyramid western perimeter wall.

Other ancient Egyptian ships
Excavation of the remains of seagoing ships at Wadi/Mersa Gawasis, south of Safaga on the Egyptian Red Sea coast, in 2004–05 and 2005–06 provides extensive physical evidence for construction techniques, wood selection, and recycling and re-use practices of the ancient Egyptians. Discoveries at Gawasis prove that common Egyptian river-oriented design and construction techniques were successful both on the Nile and at sea.

See also
 Ancient Egyptian technology
 Ships preserved in museums

References

Further reading
 Nancy Jenkins – The boat beneath the pyramid: King Cheops' royal ship (1980) 
 Paul Lipke – The royal ship of Cheops: a retrospective account of the discovery, restoration and reconstruction. Based on interviews with Hag Ahmed Youssef Moustafa (Oxford: B.A.R., 1984) 
 Björn Landström – Ships of the Pharaohs: 4000 Years of Egyptian Shipbuilding (Doubleday & Company, Inc., 1970) Library of Congress Catalog Card number 73-133207

External links

 NOVA Online | Mysteries of the Nile | March 6, 1999: The Solar Barque The Solar Barque, Nova Online
 Web archive backup: Ships of the World: An Historical Encyclopedia – "Cheops ship"
 The Giza Mapping Project
 A Visitors Perspective of the Khufu Boat Museum

Giza Plateau
Solar
Ships preserved in museums
Ship burials

ar:مراكب الشمس